Mack Drama is a music producer and promoter born in Queens, New York, U.S. & raised in Los Angeles, California.

Musical career 

Mack Drama is signed under Waka Flocka's Brick Squad Monopoly Records, Gucci Mane's 1017 Brick Squad Records, and Debra Antney's Mizay Entertainment, he also has his own record label called Brick Squad Mafia Records, which is branched off of Brick Squad Monopoly. Recently he has signed artist B3b3 (who just completed a single with his label featuring Akon); and announced signing another female artist; Delyric Oracle. Others under his wing include; Vee Tha Rula (from Kid Ink's label Alumni), Djayy Charliee, Joe Moses, A-Wax and YG Hootie.

References

External links
 The Rap Report Exclusive Interview With OG Mack Drama of 1017 Bricksquad Mafia
 Mack Drama Clears Up Rumors Between Him and Waka Flocka Flame
 HHV Exclusive: Mack Drama talks running Brick Squad Mafia, current roster, and future plans
 "OG Mack Drama: Top In the top .5% Bracket of Influencer in the world with an 81/100 Klear Score" 
 Producers and Writers of "Empire" Muse on who the main character is based on
 Mack Drama Interview and Profile on Mogul

Year of birth missing (living people)
Living people
1017 Brick Squad artists
Gang members
 Writers' organizations